is a Japanese footballer who plays as a forward for Austrian club SKN St. Pölten, on loan from Sagan Tosu.

Club career
After joining FC Wacker Innsbruck on loan in July 2021, Nitta quickly established himself as a key player for the club's reserve side, scoring 16 goals in his first 13 games including a hattrick against SV Innsbruck on 24 August 2021. He made his debut for the main Wacker squad in 2. Liga on 19 February 2022 against Kapfenberger SV.

Career statistics

Club
.

Notes

References

External links

2003 births
Living people
Association football people from Kumamoto Prefecture
Japanese footballers
Association football forwards
Sagan Tosu players
FC Wacker Innsbruck (2002) players
J1 League players
Austrian Regionalliga players
2. Liga (Austria) players
Japanese expatriate footballers
Expatriate footballers in Austria
Japanese expatriate sportspeople in Austria